The following is a list of massacres in Kenya and its predecessor polities (numbers may be approximate).

See also
Ethnic conflicts in Kenya

References
      5. https://www.standardmedia.co.ke/education/article/2001382876/mp-wants-sotik-massacre-taught-in-all-british-schools

6. https://nation.africa/kenya/counties/bomet/british-mp-teach-sotik-massacre-in-uk-schools-1926276

Kenya
Massacres

Massacres